Morrinho is a settlement in the northwest of the island of Maio in Cape Verde. It is 14 km north of the island capital Porto Inglês and 4 km north of Calheta. As of the 2010 census, its population was 444. To its north are the nature reserve Terras Salgadas and the beach of Baía da Santana.

See also
List of villages and settlements in Cape Verde

References
 

Villages and settlements in Maio, Cape Verde